Dhundhubhi may refer to

 A musical  instrument
 The name of year Dhundhubhi (1503)
 “A terrible expert “ in Sanskrit
 Dhundhubhi River